Leninism: Introduction to the Study of Leninism (Russian:Leninizm: Vvedenie v izuchenie Leninizma) is a 1925 work by Soviet politician Grigory Zinoviev. Leninism would be translated into English by The Communist Party of England as "Bolshevism or Trotskyism: Where the Line of Trotskyism is Leading" as part of The Errors of Trotskyism in May 1925. The work represents a primary document to the ideological tensions that were building within the Politburo, Central Committee, and the Communist Party of the Soviet Union.

Synopsis

Response
Leon Trotsky would respond to this work in The Permanent Revolution who satirizes the work sarcastically comparing Zinoviev to Martin Luther and described reading it as "chocking on loose cotton wool".

References

Books about communism
1925 non-fiction books
Leninism